The Diocese of Dunblane or Diocese of Strathearn was one of the thirteen historical dioceses of Scotland, before the abolition of episcopacy in the Scottish Church in 1689.

Roughly, it embraced the territories covered by the old earldoms of Strathearn and Menteith, covering the western and central portions of Perthshire.

The first record of its existence is a Papal Bull from 1155 referring to M. de Dunblan. By the episcopate of Bishop Clement, the cathedral was firmly located in Dunblane, Strathearn, Perth and Kinross.

The Diocese was led by the Bishop of Dunblane.

Medieval parishes 

 Aberfoyle
 Abernethy
 Aberuthven
 Auchterarder
 Balquhidder
 Callander
 Comrie
 Dron
 Dunblane (Cathedral)
 Dunning
 Dupplin
 Exmagirdle
 Findo Gask
 Fossoway & Tullibole
 Fowlis Wester
 Glendevon
 Kilbride
 Kilmadock
 Kilmahog
 Kincardine-in-Menteith
 Kinkell
 Leny
 Monzie
 Monzievaird
 Muthill
 Port of Menteith
 St Madoes
 Strageith
 Strowan
 Tillicoultry
 Trinity Gask
 Tulliallan
 Tullibody
 Tullicheddill

See also 
 Roman Catholic Church in Scotland
 Scottish Episcopal Church Diocese of Saint Andrews, Dunkeld and Dunblane

References

Dunblane
1155 establishments in Scotland
Religion in Perth and Kinross
Dunblane
Dioceses established in the 12th century
Dunblane